John Henry Starling,  (15 January 1883 – 5 April 1966) was the official secretary to the Governor-General of Australia from 1919 to 1927, serving Munro Ferguson, Forster and Baird.

Career 
Having originally lived in Melbourne, Starling transferred to the Commonwealth Public Service in 1902 as a clerk in the Governor General's office.

Starling transferred to the newly established Prime Minister's Department in February 1912 and was appointed chief clerk in September 1917. In June 1919 he succeeded (Sir) George Steward as official secretary to the governor-general and secretary to the Federal Executive Council. Starling was appointed OBE in 1920 and CMG in 1925. After the position of official secretary was abolished in 1927, he continued as secretary to the Federal Executive Council until 1933, and in July 1929 he was promoted to assistant secretary of the department's territories branch. In 1933 to 1935, he was secretary to the Prime Minister's Department and secretary to the Department of External Affairs.

Personal life 
Starling married Sarah Elizabeth May Price on 15 February 1911. Starling died in Canberra Community Hospital on 5 April 1966 and was cremated. He left behind two sons and a daughter.

His great-grandson is Wikipedian Tim Starling.

References 

1883 births
1966 deaths
Secretaries of the Department of the Prime Minister and Cabinet
Australian Companions of the Order of St Michael and St George
Australian Officers of the Order of the British Empire
Public servants from Melbourne
20th-century Australian public servants